Ourisia coccinea is a herbaceous perennial plant found in Chile, which is often used as an ornamental plant.

References 

 

Plantaginaceae
Ourisia
Taxa named by Antonio José Cavanilles